Dallas "Larry" Pierce (1937 – February 15, 1961) was an American ice dancer. He was the 1961 U.S. national champion with Diane Sherbloom.

Life and career 
Born to Dallas and Nellie Pierce, Larry Pierce had an elder sister, Jan, and younger brother, Russell. He attended Indiana University for several years before joining the Marines. He later worked at his family's plumbing business in Indianapolis, Indiana. He wore dark-rimmed glasses, even on the ice, and was known among friends for his sense of humor.

After graduating from high school, he was partnered with Marilyn Meeker by coach Danny Ryan at the Winter Club of Indianapolis. Junior bronze medalists at the 1958 U.S. Championships, they won the junior title at the 1959 U.S. Championships. Meeker/Pierce also trained in Cobourg, Ontario, and Lake Placid, New York during summers. Competing on the senior level, they won the silver medal at the 1960 U.S. Championships and placed fifth at the 1960 World Championships. Meeker broke her ankle in training in December 1960, six weeks before the 1961 U.S. Championships.

Ryan asked Diane Sherbloom, who had not intended to compete that season, to skate with Pierce, and Pierce's parents succeeded in persuading Sherbloom's. Sherbloom/Pierce won the gold medal at Nationals in Colorado Springs, Colorado and were named in the U.S. team to the 1961 World Championships. En route to the event, their plane, Sabena Flight 548, crashed near Brussels, Belgium, killing all on board. Pierce was 24 at the time of his death.

Results
(with Marilyn Meeker)

(with Diane Sherbloom)

References

External links

Navigation

American male ice dancers
1937 births
1961 deaths
Victims of aviation accidents or incidents in Belgium
Indiana University alumni
Sportspeople from Indianapolis
Victims of aviation accidents or incidents in 1961